Pakaridayal is a subdivision in East Champaran district in Bihar, India.
It has a PIN Code as: 845428.
It is 130 km from Patna.
One can reach here by road mainly  NH-28 towards Motihari. 
There are several towns and villages like Hajipur, Muzaffarpur, Kaanti, Mehsi, Motipur, Chakiya and Chorma in between Patna and Pakaridayal.
This village is a Nagar Panchayat.
It is situated on the bank of Budhi Gandak river, which origins from Nepal.

From the district headquarter Motihari, the distance is 17 km.

It has a post office, police station, Nagar Panchayat office, subdivision office, block office, land registrar office, telephone exchange for the govt administration purpose.

For education, there are several government and private schools.

For entertainment, there is a Single Screen Cinema Hall called "Aman Talkies".

There is a local market and many shops there for daily needs.
The market is growing now and growing well.
Since this is mainly an agricultural area, the business related to the agricultural products like wheat, rice, pulses etc. are growing fast enough.

East Champaran district